Nicolás de Noya, O.P. or Pedro de Noya (died 1511) was a Roman Catholic prelate who served as Bishop of Acerra (1504–1511).

Biography
Nicolás de Noya was ordained a priest in the Order of Preachers.
On 15 April 1504, he was appointed during the papacy of Pope Julius II as Bishop of Acerra.
He served as Bishop of Acerra until his death in 1511.

References

External links and additional sources
 (for Chronology of Bishops) 
 (for Chronology of Bishops) 

16th-century Italian Roman Catholic bishops
Bishops appointed by Pope Julius II
1511 deaths
Dominican bishops